Deborah Diesen is an American children's book author. Her book The Pout-Pout Fish was chosen by Time magazine as a Top 10 Children's Book of 2008. It was also selected for the Michigan Reads! literacy program.

Diesen lives in Grand Ledge, Michigan. In addition to a writer, she is the financial manager for a nonprofit.

Bibliography

The Pout-Pout Fish
Illustrated by Dan Hanna and published by  Farrar, Straus, & Giroux Books for Young Readers

Picture books
The Pout-Pout Fish, 2008
The Pout-Pout Fish in the Big-Big Dark, 2010
The Pout-Pout Fish Goes to School, 2014
The Pout-Pout Fish Learns to Read, 2015
The Not Very Merry Pout-Pout Fish, 2015
The Pout-Pout Fish and the Bully-Bully Shark, 2017
The Pout-Pout Fish Far, Far from Home, 2017
Pout-Pout Fish: Easter Surprise, 2018
The Pout-Pout Fish and the Can't-Sleep Blues, 2018
Pout-Pout Fish: Lucky Leprechaun, 2019
Pout-Pout Fish: Back to School, 2019
Pout-Pout Fish: Haunted House, 2019
Be Thankful, Pout-Pout Fish, 2019
Pout-Pout Fish: Christmas Spirit, 2019
The Pout-Pout Fish Cleans Up the Ocean, 2019
Pout-Pout Fish: Special Valentine, 2019
Pout-Pout Fish Goes to the Doctor, 2020
Pout-Pout Fish: Goes to the Dentist, 2020
5-Minute Pout-Pout Fish Stories, 2020
The Pout-Pout Fish and the Worry-Worry Whale, 2022
Board books
Smile, Pout-Pout Fish, 2014
Sweet Dreams, Pout-Pout Fish, 2015
Kiss, Kiss, Pout-Pout Fish, 2015
Trick or Treat, Pout-Pout Fish, 2016
Happy Easter, Pout-Pout Fish, 2017
The Pout-Pout Fish Halloween Faces, 2018
Happy Hanukkah, Pout-Pout Fish, 2020
Chapter books
You Can Do It, Pout-Pout Fish!, 2019
You Can Make a Friend, Pout-Pout Fish!, 2019
You Can Be Kind, Pout-Pout Fish!, 2020
You Can Read, Pout-Pout Fish!, 2020
Activity and novelty books
Lift-the-Flap Tab: Hide and Seek, Pout-Pout Fish, 2015
The Pout-Pout Fish: Wipe Clean Workbook ABC, 1-20, 2015
The Pout-Pout Fish Giant Sticker Book, 2016
The Pout-Pout Fish Undersea Alphabet Touch & Feel, 2016
Pout-Pout Fish Wipe Clean Dot to Dot, 2017
The Pout-Pout Fish Look-and-Find Book, 2018

Others 
The Barefooted, Bad-Tempered Baby Brigade, illustrated by Tracy Dockray, Tricycle Press, 2010
Picture Day Perfection, illustrated by Dan Santat, Abrams Books for Young Readers, 2013
Catch a Kiss, illustrated by Kris Aro McLeod, Sleeping Bear Press, 2016
Bloom, illustrated by Mary Lundquistg, Farrar, Straus, & Giroux Books for Young Readers, 2017
Pippa and Percival, Pancake and Poppy: Four Peppy Puppies, illustrated by Grace Zong, Sleeping Bear Press, 2018
Hello, Fall!, illustrated by Lucy Fleming, Farrar, Straus, & Giroux Books for Young Readers, 2018

References

External links

 
 Author's page at Macmillan

Living people
American children's writers
Year of birth missing (living people)